Giuseppe Cremonini (25 November 1866 – 9 May 1903) was an Italian operatic tenor who had a prominent opera career in Europe and the United States during the last decade of the nineteenth century.

Cremonini was born and died in Cremona, Italy.  Admired for his full lyric voice, he sang a wide repertoire that encompassed the bel canto works of Donizetti and Rossini, the Italian grand opera of Verdi, the verisimo operas of Mascagni, the French operas of Gounod and Massenet, and the German operas of Richard Wagner. He sang in several world premieres during his career, including creating the role of Chevalier des Grieux in the original 1893 production of Puccini's Manon Lescaut. An immensely popular singer, Cremonini's career was cut short upon his sudden death in 1903 at the age of 36.

Biography

Cremonini was born into an impoverished family with the name Giuseppe Bianchi. He studied under a teacher with the surname of Cima. Taking on the name Giuseppe Cremonini, he made his professional opera debut in 1889 at the Teatro Politeama in Genoa as Carlo in Donizetti's Linda di Chamounix. The following year he performed the role of Wilhelm Meister in Ambroise Thomas's Mignon at both the Teatro Filodrammatico in Milan and the Teatro Coccia in Novara. In 1891 he sang the role of Turiddu in Mascagni's Cavalleria rusticana opposite the famous primadonna Hariclea Darclée as Santuzza at the Romanian National Opera. That same year she had an enormous successes as the title hero in Mascagni's L'amico Fritz at the opera's premieres in Mantua, Faenza and Palermo. In 1892 she made his Covent Garden debut as Nadir in Bizet's Les pêcheurs de perles and sang the role of Alfredo in Verdi's La traviata with the company.

On 1 February 1893, Cremonini created the role of Chevalier des Grieux in the world premiere of Puccini's Manon Lescaut at the Teatro Regio di Torino. It was the first time of many that he would sing opposite Cesira Ferrani, who originated the role of Manon. In 1894 Cremonini and Ferrani reprised their roles at Manon Lescaut'''s La Scala premiere and sang opposite each other in the world premiere of Alberto Franchetti's Il fior d'Alpe as Paolo and Maria.

In addition to Manon Lescaut, Cremonini also appeared in operas at the Teatro Colón in Buenos Aires, Teatro Costanzi in Rome, and at the Teatro Real in Madrid in 1893 and 1894. His performances included such roles as Turiddu, the Assad in Karl Goldmark's Die Königin von Saba, and the title role in Wagner's Lohengrin among others. He also sang the title role in the world premiere of Pietro Vallini's Il Voto at the Teatro Costanzi in 1894.

In 1895 Cremonini sang in numerous roles with Opéra de Monte-Carlo including Turiddu, Amico Fritz, Enzo in La Gioconda, Count Almaviva in The Barber of Seville, and Arturo in I puritani. In 1896 he sang several roles at Covent Garden including Turiddu, Don Ottavio in Don Giovanni, Lyonel in Martha, Gennaro in Lucrezia Borgia, Edgardo in Lucia di Lammermoor, the Duke of Mantua in Rigoletto, and Faust in Mefistofele. The following year he made his debut at the Berlin State Opera as Don Ottavio. Between 1895 and 1897, he also sang the role of Fernando in Donizetti's La favorita in numerous opera houses throughout Europe.

Cremonini joined the roster of the Metropolitan Opera in 1900 where he sang roles with the company for two seasons. He made his American debut with the company as Cavaradossi in the American premiere of Puccini's Tosca. He later reprised this role in Tosca's premieres in Boston and Chicago. Cremononini's other roles at the Met included Alfredo, Lohengrin, Nadir, Rodolfo in La Bohème, Fenton in Falstaff, Faust in Mefistofele, and the title role in Gounod's Faust among others.

In 1902 he returned to Italy where he sang Edgardo in Lucia di Lammermoor, Jean Gaussin in Sapho, and the role of Stolzing in the Die Meistersinger von Nürnberg. His last performance, as Le Chevalier des Grieux in Massenet's Manon in his home city of Cremona, was just a few days before his sudden death in 1903.

Recordings
Cremonini's voice is sometimes said to have been  recorded in  1900/1 Mapleson Cylinder in recordings of duets from Tosca. However, the Mapleson recordings of Tosca are from 1902 and 1903 (when Cremonini was long gone from the Metropolitan, indeed dead by 1903). The existing recordings (from 1902/1903) are still, however, with soprano Milka Ternina or Emma Eames; but Ternina's tenor partner in  1902 (and Eames' in 1903) was in fact Di Marchi. The earlier performances with Cremonini were not recorded by Mapleson.

Cremonini, unlike other important tenors at the time (such as De Lucia, Caruso, Tamagno, et al.)  did not record commercially (if at all) in 1902/03. He is therefore, along with Di Marchi,  one of the greatest "losses" of the dawn of "serious" sound recording.

References

Sources

Jullian Budden: "Manon Lescaut (ii)", Grove Music Online'' ed. L. Macy (Accessed November 15, 2008), (subscription access) 
Biography of Giuseppe Cremonini from Operissimo.com (In German)

Italian operatic tenors
1866 births
1903 deaths
Musicians from Cremona
19th-century Italian male opera singers
20th-century Italian male opera singers